Jack Sherrill (April 14 1898 – November 26, 1973) was an American film actor of the silent era. He was one of the leading players for the Frohman Amusement Company.

Selected filmography
 The Conquest of Canaan (1916)
 The Woman in 47 (1916)
 Then I'll Come Back to You (1916)
 The Accomplice (1917)
 God's Man (1917)
 The Silent Witness (1917)
 The Rainbow (1917)
 The Profiteer (1919)
 The Invisible Ray (1920)

References

Bibliography
 Goble, Alan. The Complete Index to Literary Sources in Film. Walter de Gruyter, 1999.
 Graham, Cooper C. & Irmscher, Christoph. Love and Loss in Hollywood: Florence Deshon, Max Eastman, and Charlie Chaplin. Indiana University Press, 2021.
 Fox, Charles Donald & Silver, Milton L. Who's Who on the Screen. Ross Publishing Company, 1920.

External links

1898 births
1973 deaths
American male film actors
American male silent film actors
20th-century American male actors
Male actors from Atlanta